El Har Ihira (also written El Harihira) is a village in the commune of Sidi Slimane, in Megarine District, Ouargla Province, Algeria.

References

Neighbouring towns and cities

Populated places in Ouargla Province